Lola Margaret (born Lola Margaret Oladipupo) is a Nigerian actress, film producer and film director. Lola lost her parents in 1999 which made her to live all her childhood life with her aunt, her career came into the limelight after she starred as the lead character in the movie Bisola Alanu.

Early life and education
Margaret was born in Ilesa, Osun State, southwestern Nigeria where she went on to complete her basic and secondary school education were she obtained her west Africa examination certificate (WAEC). She holds a Bachelor of Arts degree in History and International Relations after graduating from Lagos State University.

Career
Margaret's acting career started after she met Bolaji Amusan, a Nigerian comic actor who introduced her to acting. Her career came to the limelight after she played the lead character in the movie Bisola Alanu. Lola has also starred in several movies, including Eyin Akuko and Omo Oloro, a film she produced starring the likes of Fathia Balogun and Mercy Aigbe.

Her personal life 
On 12 June 2017, she was arrested and charged by the Atlanta police for having carried out fraudulent activities. Margaret was reportedly arrested after a huge amount of money was reportedly deposited into her account and she tried to withdraw it. But later on she was released and deported to Nigeria and she is reported to have been keeping a low profile in Ibadan.

Selected filmography

 Bisola Alanu 2014
 Eyin Akuko, 2008
 Omo Oloro, 2016
 Agbara Ife (The Power of Love), 2016

See also
 List of Nigerian film producers

References

External links
 

People from Osun
Yoruba actresses
Actresses in Yoruba cinema
21st-century Nigerian actresses
Living people
Actresses from Ilesha
Lagos State University alumni
Year of birth missing (living people)
Nigerian film producers
Nigerian film directors
Nigerian film actresses
People from Osun State
Actresses from Osun State